National Highways 86A (NH 86A) is an Indian National Highway is proposed NH entirely within the state of Madhya Pradesh.

References 

86A
National highways in India (old numbering)
Proposed roads in India